La Déchirure (The Tear) is the first novel by Belgian writer Henry Bauchau. It was first published in 1966.

References

Further reading
 

1966 Belgian novels
French-language novels